Rabbi Sar Shalom ben Moses HaLevi (Hebrew: שר שלום בן משה הלוי) (Arabic: يحيى أبو زكري, Yaḥyā Abū Zikrī; d. 1204) also called Zuta was the last of the Egyptian geonim, he controversially held office in Fustat as the Nagid of the Egyptian community from 1170 to 1171 and again from around 1173 to 1195, during which he was excommunicated several times by Maimonides for tax farming.

Biography 
Born in Egypt, his father Moses ben Mevorakh was the scion of a distinguished family of physician-courtiers in Egypt. In his early years, he held the post of Av Bet Din at the Yeshivah shel Eretz Israel in Damascus. He later served as a diplomat and possibly the physician for the Fatimid court, whom he developed a close relationship with. In 1170, he succeeded his brother Nethanel ben Moses HaLevi as Nagid.  Following the collapse of the Fatimid caliphate, he was disposed from this position by the Ayyubids when they came to power in 1171. He was replaced by Maimonides who had a close relationship to the Ayyubid family, serving as their court physician. However, only two years later, in 1173, Sar Shalom regained his post and held it until at least 1195. His tenure is considered to be immensely controversial and political, as described by Megillat Zutta, written in 1197. The work recounts and criticizes the tenure of Sar Shalom, and celebrates the reinstatement of Maimonides’s as Nagid in 1195. The author, Abraham ben Hillel accuses Sar Shalom and his father, of having gained the headship of the Jews by corrupt means, including winning the favour of the government by farming taxes via local leaders and informing on fellow Jews. Additionally, the author describes Sar Shalom (who he calls Zuta meaning "little one") as a "despotic ignoramus" blinded by his aristocratic pedigree.

Letters and documents found in the Fustat Genizah provide additional details of how Sar Shalom attempted to appoint tax-farming governors in El Mahalla, Alexandria, and Bilbeis. Maimonides also confirms these accusations in his commentary on Pirkei Avot 6:4 where, in response to these events, he interpolated a passage forbidding the collection of taxes by religious leaders. Many of the local Egyptian governors resisted Sar Shalom's efforts to force them to farm taxes and from 1169 to 1170, the Jewish community of Alexandria banned anyone who recognized Sar Shaloms authority and officially excommunicated him. However, Maimonides overruled the ban in fear that it would lead to a greater divide in the community. It was also during this time that many influential  Jews lobbied the Ayyubids to dispose Sar Shalom. After the Jewish governor of El Mahalla, Perahya ben Joseph, refused to help Sar Shalom farm taxes, Sar Shalom threatened to appoint his own governor. However Perahya's supporters threatened to excommunicate anyone who recognized or cooperated with Sar Shalom's appointee. To this  Maimonides ruled in a responsum that the excommunication was binding on those who had accepted it. This prevented Sar Shalom from replacing Peraḥya.

In 1187, Maimonides threatened to excommunicate anyone who recognized or interacted with Sar Shalom's governors. The ban further excommunicated anyone who granted authority to perform marriages and divorces to rabbis who were not experts on marriage and divorce law, (a direct blow against Sar Shalom). Since the Nagid possessed the exclusive power of appointing judges, the ban was representative of the public rejection of Sar Shalom's authority. Maimonides reiterated the ruling once he assumed the office of Nagid in 1195. After the death of both Sar Shalom and Maimonides in 1204, Maimonides' son Abraham Maimonides was appointed as Nagid in 1205, this led to members of Sar Shalom’s family attempting to undermine his power by falsely claiming that he attempted to Islamize synagogue liturgy.

References 

12th-century Egyptian rabbis
Chief rabbis of Egypt
Judaism-related controversies
1204 deaths